Promenade Towers is a high-rise apartment complex in Bunker Hill, Los Angeles, California, U.S.. Developed by three Holocaust survivors, it was designed in the modernist architectural style, with palm trees and exotic plants between the towers, and completed in 1985.

History
The towers were developed by Jona Goldrich, Sol B. Kest and Nathan Shapell, three Holocaust survivors. Their construction cost US$60 million to develop. The three developers had already built the Promenade and the Promenade West Condominiums in Downtown Los Angeles.

The towers, built on 4.26 acres in Bunker Hill, were completed in 1985. At the time, they formed the first privately owned apartment complex built in Downtown Los Angeles since 1970. In 1986, tenants included University of Southern California students. Meanwhile, the three developers decided to build the Grande Promenade, another apartment complex in Downtown Los Angeles, this time for US$200 million.

Former Los Angeles Dodger's manager Tommy Lasorda, leased an apartment in the Promenade Towers.

Architecture
The buildings were designed in the modernist architectural style by Kamnitzer & Cotton-Abraham Shapiro & Associates. They span 849,298 square feet.

In the spirit of architect Peter Kamnitzer, who believed apartment complexes should include greenery, there are palm trees and exotic plants between the two towers.

References

External links
thepromenadetowers.com website

Apartment buildings in Los Angeles
Residential buildings completed in 1985
Modernist architecture in California
Residential skyscrapers in Los Angeles